Road Trippin' Through Time is a compilation album by the Red Hot Chili Peppers. It was released as a promotional only release in 2011. All songs on the compilation are from their tenure on Warner Bros. Records from 1991 to 2006.

Track listing

Notes

Personnel
Red Hot Chili Peppers
Anthony Kiedis – lead vocals
John Frusciante – guitars, backing vocals (except on track 8)
Flea – bass, backing vocals
Chad Smith – drums, percussion
Dave Navarro – guitars, backing vocals (8)

References 

2011 compilation albums
2011 greatest hits albums
Albums produced by Rick Rubin
Red Hot Chili Peppers compilation albums
Warner Records compilation albums